The Croatian Coalition was the coalition of two Croat parties in Bosnia and Herzegovina, Croatian Democratic Union 1990 and Croatian Party of Rights of Bosnia and Herzegovina. This coalition was involved in 2010 Bosnia and Herzegovina general election where it ran for seats and parliament and presidential election.
They main opposition was coalition which was formed by Croatian Democratic Union of Bosnia and Herzegovina, Croatian Peasant Party of Bosnia and Herzegovina - New Croatian Initiatieve and Croatian Party of Rights of Bosnia and Herzegovina.

In February 2010, president of the Croatian Party of Rights of Bosnia and Herzegovina, Zvonko Jurišić, signed a unity agreement with Croatian People's Union led by Milenko Brkić and Croatian Union of Herzeg-Bosnia led by Petar Milić in Mostar. According to this agreement all this party would act under one name - Croatian Party of Rights of Bosnia and Herzegovina.

At the election, this coalition won 49,524 votes, respectively 4,86% of Croat votes which gave them 4 out of 57 seats in Parliament of Bosnia and Herzegovina and 8 out of 156 seats in Parliament of Bosnia and Herzegovina. They run exclusively for Croat votes.

The coalition ended in March 2011 when HDZ 1990 and HSP BiH split; HSP BiH entered in new coalition with Social Democratic Party of Bosnia and Herzegovina, Party of Democratic Action and People's Party Work for Betterment and formed a government of the Federation of Bosnia and Herzegovina.

Croat political parties in Bosnia and Herzegovina
Political party alliances in Bosnia and Herzegovina
Defunct political parties in Bosnia and Herzegovina
Political parties disestablished in 2011
Croatian nationalist parties